David Karasek (born 6 October 1987 in Zurich) is a Swiss swimmer, who specialized in freestyle and individual medley events. He is a 10-time Swiss swimming champion, a multiple-time medley record holder, and a former member of the swimming team for Virginia Cavaliers under his personal coaches Mark Bernardino and Dirk Reinicke.

Karasek qualified for the men's 200 m individual medley at the 2012 Summer Olympics in London, by breaking a Swiss record and eclipsing a FINA B-cut of 2:01.79 from the national championships in Zurich. He challenged seven other swimmers on the second heat, including Olympic veterans Bradley Ally of Barbados, Martin Liivamägi of Estonia, and Raphaël Stacchiotti of Luxembourg. He edged out Tunisia's Taki M'rabet to pick up a seventh spot by 0.06 of a second, lowering his own Swiss record to 2:01.35. Karasek failed to advance into the semifinals, as he placed twenty-eighth overall in the preliminaries.

Karasek is a commerce graduate at the University of Virginia in Charlottesville, Virginia, where he currently resides. In February 2013, Karasek admitted in his university interview that he is working on his master's degree of finance at the IE Business School in Madrid, Spain.

References

External links
NBC Olympics Profile

1987 births
Living people
Swiss male freestyle swimmers
Olympic swimmers of Switzerland
Swimmers at the 2012 Summer Olympics
Swiss male medley swimmers
Sportspeople from Zürich
Virginia Cavaliers men's swimmers
University of Virginia Darden School of Business alumni
21st-century Swiss people